Water celery is a common name for several plants and may refer to:

Oenanthe (plant), primarily:
Oenanthe javanica (Apiaceae), native to eastern Asia
Ranunculus sceleratus (Ranunculaceae), native to North America, Africa, Europe, and Asia
Vallisneria
Vallisneria americana (Hydrocharitaceae), native to North and South America